The 1000 metres distance for men in the 2008–09 ISU Speed Skating World Cup was contested over 10 races on seven occasions, out of a total of nine World Cup occasions for the season, with the first occasion taking place in Berlin, Germany, on 7–9 November 2008, and the final occasion taking place in Salt Lake City, United States, on 6–7 March 2009.

Shani Davis of the United States defended his title from the previous season, while Denny Morrison of Canada repeated his second place, and Stefan Groothuis of the Netherlands came third.

On the last competition weekend of the season, Davis set a new world record of 1:06.42.

Top three

Race medallists

Final standings
Standings as of 8 March 2009 (end of the season).

References

Men 1000